Aglionby is a village in Cumbria, England.

Aglionby lies within the civil parish of Wetheral and thus forms part of the district administered as the City of Carlisle.
Aglionby is made up of Rosegate, The Strand, Broomy Hill and Manor Croft. Whooff House resides just off the Aglionby road end. 
Carlisle Golf Course is a stone's throw across the road. In the Imperial Gazetteer of England and Wales of 1870-72 it had a population of 119.

See also

Listed buildings in Wetheral

References

External links
 Cumbria County History Trust: Warwick (nb: provisional research only – see Talk page)
 Cumbria County History Trust: Wetheral (nb: provisional research only – see Talk page)

Villages in Cumbria
Wetheral